"The Girl Who Slept Too Little" is the second episode of the seventeenth season of the American animated television series The Simpsons. It originally aired on the Fox network in the United States on September 18, 2005, and was seen by 9.79 million people during this broadcast.

Plot
When construction on a stamp museum wakes up the Simpsons, everyone in Springfield protests against its construction to the beat of the song "Eve of Destruction". Soon, Mayor Quimby moves it to where the Springfield Cemetery used to be, and the cemetery is moved next door to the Simpsons' house. Lisa is the only member of the family whose room overlooks it. She is scared and cannot sleep at night, and ends up sleeping with Homer and Marge. The next night, Lisa meets a white-haired man known as Gravedigger Billy, who is Groundskeeper Willie's cousin. After a hand comes out of a tomb, Lisa goes to Marge and Homer's room and makes a promise that if they go to the Springfield Stamp Museum, Lisa will sleep in her room. At the museum, there is a lecture for Milton Burkhart's book "The Land of the Wild Beasts", and an advertisement based on the book for a restaurant called The Hillside Wrangler.

Lisa then feels that she can sleep in her room with the cemetery, but is already afraid, and sleeps in Homer and Marge's room again, much to their consternation. Marge and Homer then spend a night in Lisa's room and find out how scary the view really is. They then try to book a therapist, but find out that it is expensive and Lisa may have to resolve her fears herself, as she was not nurtured enough as a baby. Lisa, however, does not want to go see a therapist, and goes with Santa's Little Helper to overcome her fears at the cemetery. When the gate is locked, Lisa is left alone when Santa's Little Helper flees. Afterwards, Lisa, unnerved after witnessing Dr Nick Riviera grave-robbing, hits her head on a tombstone and faints. She experiences a dream where she is eaten by a skeleton, and then is on a web in a slime pond with a slug resembling Milhouse, and a spider resembling Bart. Lisa then has another vision with the monsters from "The Land of the Wild Beasts", and finds out they are funny, instead of scary, and that it is okay to be scared. Marge and Homer then find Lisa, wake her up, and they go home.

Reception
John Frink was nominated for a Writers Guild of America Award for Outstanding Writing in Animation at the 58th Writers Guild of America Awards for his script to this episode.

References

External links

"The Girl Who Slept Too Little" at The Simpsons.com

The Simpsons (season 17) episodes
2005 American television episodes
Fiction about cemeteries